Meneghel may refer to:

Bruno Meneghel (born 1987), Brazilian footballer
Germano Meneghel  (c. 1962 – 2011), Brazilian musician and singer-songwriter 
Maria da Graça Meneghel (born 1963), stage name Xuxa, Brazilian entertainer
Antonietta Meneghel (1893 – 1975), stage name Toti Dal Monte, Italian opera singer